Netherlands has qualified twice for the FIFA Women's World Cup: In 2015 and in 2019. They reached the 2nd round in 2015 and the final in 2019.

1991 World Cup 
The Dutch women failed in the quarter-finals of qualification for UEFA Women's Euro 1991, which served as the qualifying tournament for the first women's World Cup in China. In the group stage, the Dutch team prevailed with three wins and a draw against Ireland and Northern Ireland. In the quarter-finals they met Denmark. After a goalless draw in Denmark they lost the home game in Denekamp 0-1 after extra time. The Danes went on to qualify for the World Cup.

1995 World Cup 
As in 1991, UEFA designated the UEFA Women's Euro 1995 the qualifying tournament for that years World Cup. The Dutch missed out on qualification in the group stage. This time Iceland, against which both games were lost and Greece, against which both games were won, were the group opponents. As second in the group, they failed to reach both the quarter-finals and the World Cup. Iceland failed in the quarterfinals and so did not qualify for the World Cup.

1999 World Cup 
For the third World Cup, UEFA started its own qualification process. To date, UEFA is the only continental federation to hold separate World Cup qualifiers. The Dutch women in the group stage encountered world champion Norway, European champion Germany and England. However, the Dutch lost none of their home games against these high-caliber opponents, won 1–0 against Germany and 2–1 against England and reached a goalless draw against the world champions. But since the three away games were all lost, it was only enough for third place ahead of England. With the victory over the European champions, they had forced the German team in the relegation matches of the runners-up against the Ukraine, which were survived. World Champion Norway qualified directly for the World Cup.

2003 World Cup 
The 2003 World Cup was scheduled to again take place in China. Due to the SARS epidemic, the tournament was ultimately relocated to the United States. Thus the World Cup took place for the second time in the USA. The Dutch women faced Germany and England again in qualifying, as well as Portugal for the first time. The Dutch started with a 0–0 in England, but then lost four games before they beat Portugal in the final game. It was only enough for third-place finish. Germany, who won all the matches, this time qualified directly for the World Cup and could not be beaten there either. The English women failed in the playoffs of the runners-up, losing in the Playoff finals to France.

2007 World Cup 
Four years later, England and France were the opponents in qualification for the next World Cup, which was held for the second time in China. As other group opponents, the Dutch women had to deal with Austria and Hungary for the first time. The Dutch started with two 1-0 victories in France and Austria, but then lost 1–0 to England. After a 5–0 in Hungary, they also lost the next home game, this time with 0–2 against France. This was followed by three games that ended 4-0: In England with four goals for England, as well as in the two home games with four goals for the Netherlands against Austria and Hungary. In the end the English women succeeded in qualifying for the first time since 1995.

2011 World Cup 
After their successful Euro 2009 where they reached the semi-final, the Dutch women were eager to participate in the World Cup in their neighboring country. In March 2010 Roger Reijners took over as the national team coach from Vera Pauw, who had coached the Dutch since 2004, and was fired over differences with the association's leadership. At the draw for qualification they were tied with former World Champion Norway again. Other opponents were Belarus, Slovakia and Macedonia. The Dutch started their campaign with a 0–3 loss in Norway. They followed up with the 13–1 against Macedonia, one of their two highest international wins, but also a 1–1 against Belarus. All subsequent matches were won, except for the home game against Norway, which ended in a 2–2 draw. In the end it was only enough for second place behind Norway, which prevailed in the play-off round of the group winners against the Ukraine.

2015 World Cup

Four years later, the Dutch finally qualified for the World Cup. 2 years previous they had again reached the 2013 European Championship, but did not survive the preliminary round. At the Qualification draw for the World Cup in Canada, they were again matched with Norway. Other group opponents were neighbor Belgium, whom they beat in the first game 4–0, Portugal, Greece and first timers Albania. After a 7–0 in Portugal, they lost out on direct qualification in the home games against Norway and Belgium losing 1-2 and drawing 1-1. However, on the final day of qualifying, the Dutch were able to secure their participation in the playoff games of the runners-up by winning in Norway. In the playoffs they qualified for the first time with two wins against the Scotland and, after a 1–1 home game, by a 2–1 victory in Italy. Both goals were scored by 18-year-old Vivianne Miedema, who ended European qualifying as topscorer with 16 goals. In the other confederations, only one player, Jamaica's Shakira Duncan, also scored 16 goals but failed to qualify for the finals. Duncan had scored 14 of her 16 goals in the pre-qualifiers against weaker teams. Together with Anja Mittag, who scored 11 goals in qualifying and five in the finals they were topscorers of the overall competition.

In the draw for the groups, the Dutch women were not placed and were assigned to Group A with hosts Canada

In the second round they were eliminated by Japan.

Group A

Round of 16

2019 World Cup

In July 2017, the Dutch women used home advantage to surprise everybody and win the UEFA Women's Euro's. In the World Cup qualification starting in September 2017 they were one of the group favorites, as they were Norway's supposedly strongest opponents. They won the first qualifier against the Norwegians 1–0. After a 5–0 win in Slovakia, they then gave away their advantage with a goalless home game against Ireland. Despite victories in the other games, a 1–2 defeat in Norway on the final day ensured they only finished second in the group and the Norwegians qualified as group winners directly for the World Cup. As the best runner-up however, the European champions qualified for the playoffs of the four best runners-up. In the semifinal against Denmark the Dutch women were victorious with two wins (2-0 and 2–1). In the playoff final, they met Switzerland. In the first leg, they laid the foundation for the World Cup qualifiers with a 3–0 victory after a scoreless first half. In the second leg, they lost Anouk Dekker in the seventh minute after a red card. Miedema brought the Dutch women in the 52nd in the lead, the Swiss then needed five goals overcome the Dutch. But they managed only one goal and the Dutch qualified for the second time for a World Cup finals.

In France, like four years earlier, the Dutch team met Canada and New Zealand in the group stage as well as Cameroon. With three wins, the European champion easily qualified for the knockout stages. Again like four years earlier in 2015, Asian champion Japan was the opponent in the first knock-out round . Two goals from Lieke Martens reversed the result of 2015 and they reached the quarter-final against Italy. The Dutch women won 2–0, with Miedema scoring her third World Cup goal. The Dutch also qualified for the Olympic Games 2020 for the first time. In the semi-final, after 90 goalless minutes, extra time allowed Jackie Groenen to score the only goal of the match. The Dutch women reached the final, where they lost to defending champions USA 0–2.

Group E

Round of 16

Quarter-finals

Semi-finals

Final

2023 World Cup

Group E

FIFA World Cup record

 * Draws include knockout matches decided on penalty kicks.

Record by opponent

Goalscorers

References

 
World Cup
Countries at the FIFA Women's World Cup